Shangri-la is a small, secluded valley area in the McMurdo Dry Valleys completely isolated by mountain peaks. It is located immediately south of Joyce Glacier and Pewe Peak. Penance Pass connects it to Miers Valley. The valley was named by personnel of the Victoria University's Antarctic Expeditions (VUWAE) (1960-61), who found it reminded them of the fictional paradise Shangri-La in the novel Lost Horizon by James Hilton.

Mount Lama forms the south rampart of the valley.

References

Mountain passes of Victoria Land
Scott Coast